George Herbert Walker Bush served as the 41st president of the United States (1989–1993), the 43rd vice president (1981–1989), the 11th director of central intelligence (1976–1977), and as a United States representative from Texas (1967–1971).

Congressional elections (1964–1970)

1964

1966

1968

1970

Presidential elections (1980–1992)

1980

1984

1988

1992

References

George H. W. Bush
Bush, George H.W.
Bush, George H.W.